Orange County Airport  is a county-owned public-use airport located three miles (5 km) southwest of the central business district of Orange, in Orange County, Texas, United States.

Although most U.S. airports use the same three-letter location identifier for the FAA and IATA, Orange County Airport is assigned ORG by the FAA but has no designation from the IATA (which assigned ORG to Zorg en Hoop Airport in Paramaribo, Suriname).

Facilities and aircraft 
For the 12-month period ending December 15, 2001, the airport had 11,332 aircraft operations, an average of 51 per day: 93% general aviation and 7% air taxi. In August 2017, there were 29 aircraft based at this airport: 24 single-engine, 2 multi-engine, 1 helicopter and 2 ultra-lights.

References 

Flafsted.R (2006).German Companies.All around Europe. 23,(4)5-8
Jefferson.M(2008). Airport weekly. Airports Today. 19,(4)7-12

External links 
 Orange County Airport page at Orange County website

Airports in Texas
Transportation in Orange County, Texas
Buildings and structures in Orange County, Texas